Kirizumi Dam is a gravity dam located in Gunma Prefecture in Japan. The dam is used for flood control. The catchment area of the dam is 20.4 km2. The dam impounds about 13  ha of land when full and can store 2500 thousand cubic meters of water. The construction of the dam was started on 1968 and completed in 1975.

References

Dams in Gunma Prefecture